The 1988–89 Campionato Sammarinese di Calcio season was the 4th season since its establishment. It was contested by 10 teams, and S.P. Domagnano won the championship.

Regular season

Championship playoff

First round
S.C. Faetano 0-0 (pen 4-3) F.C. Domagnano
S.S. Murata 2-0 S.P. Cailungo

Second round
F.C. Domagnano 0-0 (pen 4-2) S.S. Murata
S.C. Faetano 4-1 S.P. Cailungo

Third round
F.C. Domagnano 2-0 S.S. Murata
S.P. La Fiorita 0-0 (pen 5-4) S.C. Faetano

Fourth round
F.C. Domagnano 1-0 S.C. Faetano
S.P. La Fiorita 1-0 A.C. Libertas

Semifinal
A.C. Libertas 0-1 F.C. Domagnano

Final
F.C. Domagnano 2-1 S.P. La Fiorita

References
San Marino - List of final tables (RSSSF)

Campionato Sammarinese di Calcio
San
Campionato